Rachel Feinstein may refer to:

 Rachel Feinstein (artist) (born 1971), American artist
 Rachel Feinstein (comedian), American actress and stand-up comedian